The Hispaniolan moist forests are a tropical moist broadleaf forest ecoregion on the island of Hispaniola. They cover , around 60% of the island's area.

Geography

Moist forests occur on most of the eastern half the Dominican Republic, stretching from the coast all the way to high elevations in the mountains. In Haiti, they are found in the Tiburon Peninsula in the southern part of the country as well as the Massif du Nord. The drainage basins for the island's main rivers, the Yaque del Norte and Yaque del Sur, Yuna, and Artibonite, occur in this ecoregion. Soils are either calcareous (neutral or somewhat alkaline) or acidic.

Climate
Mesic forests receive  of annual rainfall, while more than  falls in wet forests. The rainy season lasts from April to December. Freezing temperatures occur in the highest zones at certain times of the year.

Flora

Moist forests are classified as being either lowland mesic, montane mesic, lowland wet, or montane wet. Characteristic lowland species are Haitian catalpa (Catalpa longissima), particularly in well-drained soils, and West Indian mahogany (Swietenia mahagoni). Puerto Rican royal palm (Roystonea borinquena) is common where soil is calcareous. Paradise tree (Simarouba glauca), anón de majagua (Lonchocarpus heptaphyllus), jagua (Genipa americana), black olive (Bucida buceras), West Indian lancewood (Oxandra lanceolata) and amacey (Tetragastris balsamifera) are found in small secondary stands. Isolated trees are home to fustic (Maclura tinctoria), logwood (Haematoxylum campechianum), iris (Hippeastrum puniceum), caracolí (Abarema glauca), córbano (Albizia berteriana), West Indian elm (Guazuma ulmifolia), palo de leche (Rauvolfia nitida), and spiny fiddlewood (Citharexylum spinosum). Areas where soils are superficial or savannas have formed from degraded forest are indicated by trees such as the sandpaper tree (Curatella americana), grandleaf seagrape (Coccoloba pubescens), Jamaican nettletree (Trema micrantha) and Tabebuia species. Cashews (Anacardium occidentale) are present in zones that have marginal earth and precipitation closer to that of the dry forests. Yellow olivier (Buchenavia capitata), sablito (Schefflera morototoni), maricao (Byrsonima spicata) aguacatillo (Alchornea latifolia), West Indian cherry (Prunus myrtifolia), árbol de Santa Maria (Calophyllum brasiliense), cocuyo (Hirtella triandra), American muskwood (Guarea guidonia), palo de yagua (Casearia arborea), locust (Hymenaea courbaril), balatá (Manilkara domingensis) and sierra palm (Prestoea montana) grow in mesic forests. Hispaniolan pine (Pinus occidentalis) is common on lateritic soils. Wet forests consist of trees covered by parasitic plants and epiphytes. The principal indicator species include tree ferns (Cyathea spp.) and Chionanthus species. At higher elevations, characteristic species are the trembling schefflera (Schefflera tremula), black sapote (Diospyros digyna), almendrón (Prunus occidentalis), Fadyen's silktassel (Garrya fadyenii), Weinmannia pinnata, Oreopanax capitatus, Brunellia comocladifolia, Hispaniolan pines, and Cyathea species.

Fauna

Birds
Birds of the moist forests include the Hispaniolan amazon (Amazona ventralis), Hispaniolan parakeet (Aratinga chloroptera), Hispaniolan lizard cuckoo (Coccyzus longirostris), palm crow (Corvus palmarum), American kestrel (Falco sparverius), vervain hummingbird (Mellisuga minima), narrow-billed tody (Todus angustirostris), stolid flycatcher (Myiarchus stolidus), Hispaniolan pewee (Contopus hispaniolensis), rufous-throated solitaire (Myadestes genibarbis), Hispaniolan woodpecker (Melanerpes striatus), white-necked crow (Corvus leucognaphalus), palmchat (Dulus dominicus), Hispaniolan trogon (Priotelus roseigaster), ruddy quail-dove (Geotrygon montana), red-tailed hawk (Buteo jamaicensis), white-winged warbler (Xenoligea montana), green-tailed warbler (Microligea palustris), Antillean siskin  (Carduelis dominicensis), La Selle thrush (Turdus swalesi), eastern chat-tanager (Calyptophilus frugivorus), and Hispaniolan crossbill (Loxia megaplaga).

Mammals
Native mammals include the Hispaniolan hutia (Plagiodontia aedium), Hispaniolan solenodon (Solenodon paradoxus), and 18 bat species such as the Cuban flower bat (Phyllonycteris poeyi).

Reptiles
Reptiles include Marcano's galliwasp (Panolopus marcanoi) and Ialtris haetianus.

References

Neotropical tropical and subtropical moist broadleaf forests
Ecoregions of the Caribbean
Ecoregions of the Dominican Republic
Ecoregions of Haiti
Geography of Hispaniola